The Homework First is a combination lock parental control device for the Nintendo Entertainment System made by SafeCare Products, Inc. of Dundee, Illinois and Master Lock. The lock features a "Self-Setting" combination that attaches to the open bay of a front-loading NES-001 system via a screw hole below the cartridge slot which enables the lock to grab the console like a vise to prevent both the insertion of cartridges and the removal of the device. Around 25,000 units were claimed to have been sold.

Reception
ACE magazine panned the device on a conceptual level during their 1989 CES coverage.

Jeuxvideo.com cited the device as one of the first video game parental controls.

See also
 10NES (lockout chip preventing games not authorized by Nintendo from running)
 Nintendo Entertainment System
 Nintendo
 Parental controls

References

Nintendo Entertainment System accessories
Locks (security device)